The C1 Ariete is a 3rd generation main battle tank of the Italian Army, developed by Consorzio Iveco Oto Melara (CIO), a consortium formed by IVECO and OTO Melara. The chassis and engine were produced by Iveco, while the turret and fire-control system were supplied by OTO Melara. The vehicle carries the latest optical and digital-imaging and fire-control systems, enabling it to fight day and night and to fire on the move. Six prototypes were developed by 1988, which were subject to intensive testing. The following year the vehicles travelled a combined 16,000 km. Deliveries were first planned for 1993, and took place in 1995 due to delays. Final delivery occurred 7 years later in August 2002.

Design
The tank has a conventional layout similar to other Western MBTs: a driver located at the front of the hull, the fighting compartment towards the middle, and the engine compartment in the rear of the hull.

Armament
The Ariete's main armament is 120 mm smoothbore gun, designed by OTO Breda, similar to the Rheinmetall L/44. The gun fires most NATO-standard rounds of the same calibre. It carries 42 rounds, 15 ready rounds are stored vertically on the left side of the main gun breech. The 27 other are stowed in a hull rack to the left of the driver's station. The gun barrel has a thermal insulating sleeve and a fume extractor; it is fully stabilized in both azimuth and elevation by an electro-hydraulic drive system.

Secondary armament consists of a 7.62 mm MG 42/59 coaxial machine gun operated by the tank gunner or commander and an additional 7.62 mm MG 42/59 configured as an anti-aircraft weapon operated by the main-gun loader from his hatch.

Fire control and target acquisition
The tank's advanced fire-control system, manufactured by Galileo Avionica, is designated OG14L3 TURMS, and includes day and night panoramic capability for the commander's SP-T-694 primary sight (developed collaboratively by SFIM/Galileo), a stabilized platform including a thermal gunner's sight and a laser rangefinder to increase accuracy and expedite target detection and targeting, and a digital fire-control computer, which is capable of measuring wind speed, humidity, and exterior weather conditions, combining them with the turret's angle of elevation, attitude, and the barrel's physical wear to increase accuracy. 

This computer is also a component of the tank's navigation system and allows for the exchange of tactical information between vehicles in a network. The Ariete has a "hunter-killer" capability in which the commander spots and designates targets for the gunner in a 360° field of vision around the vehicle without changing his position or having to open the turret hatch for visual identification of targets. The commander's sight also has a vertical traverse from –10° to +60° from the horizontal, which allows the tank to engage low-flying airborne threats—primarily helicopters. During night fighting, the commander and gunner both share the thermal sight which is able to resolve a 2.3×x2.3 m target from a distance of 1,500 m.

Crew and tank protection
The Ariete's armour is a steel and composite blend, the turret front shape is similar to the British Challenger 1 and the American M1 Abrams.

The Ariete features two side-mounted, electronically fired GALIX 80mm grenade launchers. Each launcher consists of four 80 mm barrels which can be intermixed with either smoke or chaff grenades.  The smoke grenades are capable of shrouding the tank from visual or thermal detection, while the chaff grenades disperse the tank's radar cross section. The tank is fully NBC protected.

Powerplant and drivetrain
The Ariete is powered by a 25.8-litre turbo-charged Fiat-Iveco MTCA 12-cylinder diesel engine in a Vee configuration rated at 937 kilowatts (1,250 hp) at 2,300 rpm, with a maximum torque of 4,615 N·m at 1,600 rpm driving through a ZF LSG3000 automatic transmission, with four forward gears and two reverse, allowing for a top cruising speed of 65 km/h and a 0–32 km/h acceleration in 6 seconds. The computer-controlled transmission allows it to climb grades rated up to 60%, and can ford waterways of up to 1.25 m on-the-fly. The entire engine and transmission assembly can be replaced in under 1 hour.

The Ariete's independent suspension system consists of 14 torsion bars with suspension arms, 10 hydraulic shock absorbers (installed on roadwheels numbers 1, 2, 3, 6 and 7), and 14 friction dampers.

History

Further development

During the first years of adoption, the Ariete MBT showed some deficiencies regarding the powerplant. While the original V12 1,250 hp FIAT-Iveco MTCA (Modular Turbo-Charged Aftercooler) was a coupling of two of the V6 engines used by several Italian Army vehicles such as the Centauro tank destroyer and the Dardo IFV, it produced less power than the most advanced contemporary western designs. The Ariete's engine had to run at a high RPM to perform well, thus reducing the operating time between failures.

Moreover, to retain a good power-to-weight ratio, the total weight of the tank had to be kept below 60 tonnes. The relatively light weight of the Ariete helped lower consumption and facilitated the transport and mobility of the MBT (especially over bridges). This was obtained partially at the expense of the thickness of the armour that, only partially compensated by the good ballistic shape of the vehicle, raised some doubt about its ability to survive in the harshest environments.

As an improvement, Iveco developed a new version of the MTCA engine. The new engine had to be adopted during the first general revision of the existing vehicles, but seems to have been blocked by technical and financial problems. As for the armour, Oto Melara developed two different sets (with different thickness levels, depending upon mission nature) of adjunctive armour, shown for the first time at Eurosatory 2002.

Ariete AMV 
In the early 2000s, the Italian Army was interested in developing a new version of Ariete (C2 Ariete or Ariete Mk. 2 designations were considered) which would enter service over the following years with the planned acquisition of 300 units. Budget limitations drastically reduced the number of improved Ariete (order reduced to 200) and eventually caused the subsequent cancellation of the program. The planned improvements were therefore to be applied to the C1 Ariete during the future major revisions.

The Ariete AMV is a mid life update (Ammodernamento di Mezza Vita) of the Ariete for 125 units and includes:

 Upgraded IVECO V12 MTCA with common-rail injection and 1,500 hp (1,103 kW)
 Upgraded transmission 
 New tracks
 New electronics and optronics (LOTHAR SD for the gunner, Multispectral ATTILA D for the commander)
 Add-on armor and mine protection
 Integration of SICCONA battlefield management system

Operators

Each tank battalion fields three tank companies with thirteen Ariete each and two Ariete for the battalion commander and the deputy commander.

 Italian Army – 200
 Bersaglieri Brigade "Garibaldi"
 4th Tank Regiment (31st Tank Battalion "M.O. Andreani"), in Persano
 Armored Brigade "Ariete"
 32nd Tank Regiment (3rd Tank Battalion "M.O. Galas"), in Tauriano
 132nd Tank Regiment (8th Tank Battalion "M.O. Secchiaroli"), in Cordenons
 Italian Army Cavalry School
 Italian Army Transport and Materiel School

See also
 List of main battle tanks by generation

References

External links

 Official website

Post–Cold War main battle tanks
Main battle tanks of Italy
OTO Melara
Military vehicles introduced in the 1990s